Mokhovoye is a rural locality (a settlement) in Samodurvskoye Rural Settlement, Povorinsky District, Voronezh Oblast, Russia. The population was 97 as of 2010. There are 2 streets.

Geography 
Mokhovoye is located 6 km southeast of Povorino (the district's administrative centre) by road. Elevator is the nearest rural locality.

References 

Rural localities in Povorinsky District